Medvezhyegorsky District is an administrative district (raion), one of the fifteen in the Republic of Karelia, Russia. Its administrative center is the town of Medvezhyegorsk. As of the 2010 Census, the total population of the district was 31,864, with the population of Medvezhyegorsk accounting for 48.7% of that number.

Administrative and municipal status
Within the framework of administrative divisions, Medvezhyegorsky District is one of the fifteen in the Republic of Karelia and has administrative jurisdiction over 1 town (Medvezhyegorsk), 2 urban-type settlements (Pindushi and Povenets), and 144 rural localities. As a municipal division, the district is incorporated as Medvezhyegorsky Municipal District. The town, the 2 urban-type settlements, and 28 rural localities are incorporated into 3 urban settlements, while the remaining 116 rural localities are incorporated into 6 rural settlements within the municipal district. The town of Medvezhyegorsk serves as the administrative center of both the administrative and municipal district.

References

Notes

Sources

Districts of the Republic of Karelia
 
